Clyde "Big Splo" Spearman (July 23, 1912 – February 13, 1955) was an American baseball outfielder in the Negro leagues. He played from 1932 to 1946 with several teams. Four of his brothers, Charles, Henry, Willie, and Codie, and his nephew Fred also played in the Negro leagues.

References

External links
 and Baseball-Reference Black Baseball stats and Seamheads

Birmingham Black Barons players
Philadelphia Stars players
New York Black Yankees players
Pittsburgh Crawfords players
New York Cubans players
Chicago American Giants players
Baseball players from Arkansas
People from Arkadelphia, Arkansas
1912 births
1955 deaths
20th-century African-American sportspeople
Baseball outfielders
Burials at Long Island National Cemetery